Arlene Goldbard is a writer, social activist and consultant whose focus is the intersection of culture, politics, and spirituality. She is best known as an advocate for cultural democracy and a creator of cultural critique and new cultural policy proposals.

Arlene was born in New York, but grew up in the San Francisco Bay Area. After extended sojourns in Sacramento, Washington DC, Baltimore, Mendocino County, Seattle, and the San Francisco Bay Area, she now resides in Lamy, NM, with her husband, the sculptor Rick Yoshimoto.

Work
Arlene has addressed numerous academic and community audiences in the U.S. and Europe, on topics ranging from the ethics of community arts practice to the development of integral organizations.

She has also provided advice and counsel to hundreds of community-based organizations, independent media groups, and public and private funders and policymakers. They include various nonprofits such as Appalshop, Global Kids, the Independent Television Service, the National Campaign for Freedom of Expression, and the New Museum of Contemporary Art; and foundations such as the Rockefeller Foundation and the Paul Robeson Fund for Independent Media; a score of state arts agencies; and many others.

In 2015, she was named one of 2015’s “Fifty most powerful and influential leaders in the nonprofit arts.” She was also named one of 50 Purpose Prize Fellows, recognizing social innovators over 60, for her role as Chief Policy Wonk of the U.S. Department of Arts and Culture.

In May, 2009, she was one of the organizers of a White House Briefing on Art, Community, Social Justice, National Recovery, which brought more than 60 artists and creative organizers into dialogue with administration officials about their roles in bringing about cultural recovery and sustainable community. In October, 2009, the Cultural Policy Working Group formed there released a new proposal, "Art & The Public Purpose: A New Framework," putting forward five key concepts to support a significant new investment in "art’s public purpose to mend our social fabric, promote freedom of expression and a vibrant, inclusive national dialogue, and revitalize both education and commerce with the creativity that has always been the wellspring of our energy and success." By gathering individual and organizational endorsements and promoting dialogue on art's public purpose, the Framework's founding endorsers hope to create sufficient demand to persuade public officials to adopt the new policy proposal.

Notable positions

Goldbard serves as Chief Policy Wonk of the U.S. Department of Arts and Culture, the nation's first and only people-powered department (the USDAC is not a government agency). She has served as Vice Chair of the Board of ALEPH: Alliance for Jewish Renewal, and Tsofah/President of Congregation Eitz Or in Seattle. She is currently President of the Board of Directors of The Shalom Center.

Additionally, she co-founded such activist groups as the San Francisco Artworkers’ Coalition, the California Visual Artists Alliance, Bay Area Lawyers for the Arts and Draft Help.

Publications
Crossroads: Reflections on the Politics of Culture, Talmage, CA: DNA Press, 1990.
Creative Community: The Art of Cultural Development, New York, NY: The Rockefeller Foundation, 2000.
Community, Culture and Globalization, New York, NY: The Rockefeller Foundation, 2002.
Clarity, iUniverse, 2004.
New Creative Community: The Art of Cultural Development, Oakland, CA: New Village, 2006.
The Culture of Possibility: Art, Artists & The Future, Waterlight, 2013.
The Wave, Waterlight, 2013.

References

External links

 U.S. Department of Arts and Culture

American writers
American women writers
American activists
Living people
Year of birth missing (living people)
21st-century American women